Events in the year 2010 in Nigeria.

Incumbents

Federal government
 President: Umaru Musa Yar'Adua (until 5 May), Goodluck Jonathan (starting 5 May)
 Vice President: 
 Until 5 May: Goodluck Jonathan
 5 May – 19 May: vacant
 Starting 19 May: Namadi Sambo
 Senate President: David Mark
 House Speaker: Dimeji Bankole
 Chief Justice: Aloysius Iyorgyer Katsina-Alu

Governors
 Abia State: Theodore Orji (PDP)
 Adamawa State: Murtala Nyako (PDP)
 Akwa Ibom State: Godswill Akpabio (PDP)
 Anambra State: Peter Obi (APGA)
 Bauchi State: Isa Yuguda (ANPP)
 Bayelsa State: Timipre Sylva (PDP)
 Benue State: Gabriel Suswam (PDP)
 Borno State: Ali Modu Sheriff (ANPP)
 Cross River State: Liyel Imoke (PDP)
 Delta State: Emmanuel Uduaghan (PDP)
 Ebonyi State: Martin Elechi (PDP)
 Edo State: Adams Aliyu Oshiomole (AC)
 Ekiti State: Kayode Fayemi (AC)
 Enugu State: Sullivan Chime (PDP)
 Gombe State: Mohammed Danjuma Goje (PDP)
 Imo State: Ikedi Ohakim (PDP)
 Jigawa State: Sule Lamido (PDP)
 Kaduna State: Patrick Ibrahim Yakowa (PDP)
 Kano State: Ibrahim Shekarau (ANPP)
 Katsina State: Ibrahim Shema (PDP)
 Kebbi State: Usman Saidu Nasamu Dakingari (PDP)
 Kogi State: Ibrahim Idris (PDP)
 Kwara State: Bukola Saraki (AC)
 Lagos State: Babatunde Fashola (AC)
 Nasarawa State: Aliyu Doma (PDP)
 Niger State: Mu'azu Babangida Aliyu (PDP)
 Ogun State: Gbenga Daniel (PDP)
 Ondo State: Olusegun Mimiko (LP)
 Osun State: Rauf Aregbesola (AC)
 Oyo State: Christopher Alao-Akala (PDP)
 Plateau State: Jonah David Jang (PDP)
 Rivers State: Chibuike Amaechi (PDP)
 Sokoto State: Aliyu Magatakarda Wamakko (PDP)
 Taraba State: Danbaba Suntai (PDP)
 Yobe State: Ibrahim Gaidam (ANPP)
Zamfara State: Mahmud Shinkafi (PDP)

Events

 5 May – President Umaru Musa Yar'Adua dies of Pericarditis, and is succeeded by Vice President Goodluck Jonathan.

References

 
Years of the 21st century in Nigeria
Nigeria
2010s in Nigeria
Nigeria